Ana María Hernando (born 1959) is an Argentine visual artist. Hernando currently lives in Boulder, Colorado. Ana Maria Hernando's artwork includes feminine fiber installations that celebrate the lives and community of Latina women. In addition to fiber arts, Hernando also incorporates painting, drawing, printmaking, and bilingual poetry into her art and installations.

Work 
She received her Bachelor of Fine Arts from California College of the Arts (CCA) in 1990.

Hernando's work has been featured at the Oklahoma Contemporary, the Tweed Museum of Art, the Marfa Contemporary, the Biennial of the Americas, the International Center of Bethlehem in Palestine, the Museum of Contemporary Art Denver, the Boulder Museum of Contemporary Art, and at the CU Art Museum at the University of Colorado Boulder.

References

External links 

1959 births
Living people
20th-century Argentine women artists
21st-century Argentine women artists
Argentine emigrants to the United States
California College of the Arts alumni